Ang Swee Chai is an orthopedic surgeon and author. She is a co-founder of the charity Medical Aid for Palestinians.

Life
Ang was born in Penang, Malaysia but raised in Singapore. She attended Kwong Avenue Primary School, Raffles Girls' School, and the National University of Singapore where she studied medicine. She then received a master's degree in Occupational Medicine in 1976.

In 1977, Ang married Singaporean human rights lawyer Francis Khoo. Two weeks after the marriage, she was briefly detained during a government crackdown on dissidents as the authority attempted to arrest her husband. She fled to London to be with her husband and they were granted asylum there. She trained to be an orthopaedic surgeon in Britain, where she obtained her FRCS (Eng) and completed her training in Newcastle. She later became the first female consultant orthopaedic surgeon at St Bartholomew's Hospital in London.

In August 1982, Ang responded to an appeal for medical personnel from Christian Aid to treat war casualties in Lebanon and went to work at the Gaza Hospital near the Sabra and Shatila refugee camp in Beirut. The following month, she became witness to the Sabra-Shatila massacre during the Israeli invasion of Lebanon in 1982. She and two other hospital staff testified to Israeli Kahan Commission on the Sabra and Shatila massacre in September 1982.

With her husband, Francis Khoo, and some friends, Ang helped to form the British charity, Medical Aid for Palestinians, following the 1982 massacres.

Awards and honours
In 1987, President Yasser Arafat awarded Ang the Star of Palestine, the highest award for service to the Palestinian people.

In 2016, Ang was inducted into the Singapore Women's Hall of Fame. However, she could not receive the award in person in Singapore as she retains her British citizenship and refused to give up either British or Singaporean citizenships. Singapore does not allow dual citizenship.

Controversies 

On 24 September 2014, The Telegraph reported that Ang had forwarded a video entitled “CNN Goldman Sachs & the Zio Matrix” featuring Ku Klux Klan leader David Duke. Ang responded by saying “I am concerned that if there is any truth in the video, that Jews control the media, politics and banking, what on earth is going on? I was worried.”

Publications
Ang wrote a book on her experience, From Beirut to Jerusalem: A Woman Surgeon with the Palestinians. The book has been translated into Chinese. She also co-authored  War Surgery: Field Manual with Hans Husum and Erik Fosse.

References

External  links
From Beirut to Jerusalem, by Ang Swee Chai

1948 births
British orthopaedic surgeons
Living people
People from Penang
People from Singapore
Raffles Girls' Secondary School alumni
Singaporean expatriates in the United Kingdom
University of Singapore alumni